Velvet Chain is a bi-coastal alternative rock band whose sound features a mixture of trip hop, rock, and pop, with a jazz/funk flavor. (The band has sometimes been known to refer to their work as "space-jazz" or "moody groove music" - which is also the title of one of their albums.)

Velvet Chain was formed in 1993 by Jeff Stacy (legal name “Jeffrey Calamusa”) (formerly of “Heat Your Shack” and “Tunnelmental”) and Erika Amato, the creative core of the band.

They found mainstream attention after they appeared on an episode of Buffy the Vampire Slayer, ("Never Kill A Boy On The First Date") and later had a song included in the show's soundtrack.

Their music has also been used on other TV shows, including HBO's Sex and the City, MTV's Road Rules, CBS's Beverly Hills, 90210 and ABC's Big Shots.

The band last played live in 2007. Core founding members Jeff Stacy (Jeffrey Calamusa) and Erika Amato were working on a new album before Jeff's untimely death in August 2020. Erika is continuing to work on the album and plans to release it at a later date.

Discography
Groovy Side (1996), out of print
Warm (CD-5) (September, 1997), out of print
Warm (full length) (December, 1997)
Frenchie Vinyl (1998), out of print
The Buffy EP (1999)
Moody Groove Music (2000)
Velvet Chain Live at the Temple Bar (2000)
The Velvet Chain Custom Album (2001), this album allows the buyer to pick the tracks, artwork and title of the album. There are also several preset choices available.
Asteroid Belt (2003)
Space Patrol (EP) (2004)

Members
Current members
Erika Amato - lead vocals

Former members
Jeff Stacy - bass guitarist 
Brian Reardon - guitar
Marc Antonio - keyboards
Dan Wistrom - guitar
Brett Chassen - drums
Jeff Mince - drums and electronics
Tom Calzini - guitar
Sarah Josephs - keyboards
Craig Van Sant - drums
Jay Stolmack - woodwinds

Additional musicians
A large number of collaborators have also been involved with the various albums. See specific albums articles for more details.

References

External links
The NEW Official Velvet Chain Website
Defunct Velvet Chain Website
Velvet Chain facebook page

Trip hop groups
Musical groups from Los Angeles
Musical groups established in 1993